The 1930–31 season was Manchester United's 35th season in the Football League.

At the end of the season, United finished last in the league and were relegated to the Second Division, having won just seven games all season and lost all of their opening 12 fixtures. Herbert Bamlett was sacked as manager with six games remaining and relegation looking virtually certain, with club secretary Walter Crickmer stepping in as acting manager for the rest of the season (though Crickmer would, in the event, stay in charge until the summer of 1932). The last game of the season, a 4–4 home draw with Middlesbrough, was watched by fewer than 4,000 spectators, as the Great Depression further affected attendances.

First Division

FA Cup

Squad statistics

References

Manchester United F.C. seasons
Manchester United